Tauche (Lower Sorbian: Tuchow) is a municipality on both sides of the river Spree in the Oder-Spree district, in Brandenburg, Germany. The large municipality consists of 12 parts (German: Ortsteile) or villages with other local parts/settlements, respectively. The seat of the municipal administration is located in the village of the same name.

In 1813, explorer of Australia and naturalist, Ludwig Leichhardt, was born in the hamlet of Sabrodt near Trebatsch. That made, in 1998, the federal state of Brandenburg award the village of Trebatsch the additional name "Leichhardt-Gemeinde" (Leichhardt Municipality).

Author Günter de Bruyn has been living since 1969 in Görsdorf. In Kossenblatt there is a castle, Schloss Kossenblatt, which is said to have been the favourite palace of the "Soldier King" Frederick William I of Prussia.

Division of the municipality 
Tauche consists of the following districts (German: Ortsteile):

Briescht (Lower Sorbian Brěšc), including the local place Schwarzer Kater
Falkenberg (Sokolnica)
Giesensdorf (Gižojce), including the village Wulfersdorf
Görsdorf (Górice), including the village Premsdorf (Pśemysłojce) and the local place Blabber
Kossenblatt (Kósomłot)
Lindenberg
Mittweide
Ranzig (Rańšyk)
Stremmen (Tšumjeń)
Tauche (Tuchow)
Trebatsch (Žrobolce), including the villages Rocher (Rochow), Sabrodt (Zabrod) and Sawall (Zawal)
Werder/Spree (Łucka)

History
From 1815 to 1947, Tauche was part of the Prussian Province of Brandenburg. From 1952 to 1990, it was part of the Bezirk Frankfurt of East Germany.

Demography

See also
Falkenberg Mast

References

External links 

Localities in Oder-Spree